IKEA Heights is a 2009 comedic melodrama web series created by Dave Seger, Paul Bartunek, Delbert Shoopman, Spencer Strauss, and Tom Kauffman for Channel 101. A spoof of soap operas, the series was filmed covertly inside the IKEA store in Burbank, California. IKEA Heights stars Randall Park, Whitney Avalon, and Matt Braunger.

Entertainment Weeklys Whitney Pastorek wrote that the series "is so brilliant and awesome that its glories can really only be diminished by additional words."

Madeleine Löwenborg-Frick, a spokesperson for IKEA's Canadian branch, said of the series, "Absolutely, we think it's funny. We see the humour in it and we approach our own marketing with a similar tongue-in-cheek humour. But unauthorized filming in our stores isn't a good thing. There's proper channels that people who want to film in our stores can go through."

References

External links

American comedy web series
American television soap operas
Channel 101
IKEA
Television soap opera parodies